Pseudargyria is a genus of moths of the family Crambidae.

Species
Pseudargyria acuta Song & Chen in Chen, Song & Yuan, 2003
Pseudargyria interruptella (Walker, 1866)
Pseudargyria marginepunctalis (Hampson, 1896)
Pseudargyria parallelus (Zeller, 1867)

References

Natural History Museum Lepidoptera genus database

Crambinae
Crambidae genera